James A. Lyons may refer to:

 James Lyons (admiral) (1927–2018), admiral in the United States Navy
 James Alexander Lyons (1861–1920), American accountancy author